The Flyweight class in the boxing at the 1996 Summer Olympics competition was the second-lightest class at the 1996 Summer Olympics in Atlanta, Georgia. The weight class is open for boxers from 51 kilograms. The competition started on 23 July 1996 and ended on 4 August 1996.

Medalists

Results

References

External links
amateur-boxing

Flyweight